King Edward railway station was a railway station at King Edward, King Edward Parish, Aberdeenshire, Scotland on the rural branchline to Macduff. It was opened in 1860 to passengers by the Banff, Macduff and Turriff Junction Railway and was closed to regular passenger traffic in 1951.

History
The name "King Edward" originated from the Scottish Gaelic. The first element "King" or "kin" comes from "Ceann" meaning a headland and "Edward" may refer to "cathair-thalmhainn" that is a "Yarrow" plant in English. Another interpretation is "Head of the Valley". The hamlet where the station was located is now known as "Balchers".

The station served the needs of the local farms in Buchan midway between Turriff and Banff, as well as the King Edward School that stood nearby as did the church and church hall. Passenger services were withdrawn after 30 September 1951. A rail tour visited on 13 June 1960.

Infrastructure
The main station buildings stood on the northern side of the single track line. At first the station only had a single platform, however a passing loop and a second platform were added in 1895. King Edward's signalbox stood on the northern platform on the Plaidy end and was opened on 29 April 1895 and closed on 6 January 1936 when it was replaced by a ground frame. A station house and cottage stood near the church hall.

The station had a pedestrian overbridge and a wooden shelter stood on the southern platform. A road overbridge stood over the line to Plaidy. The goods yard was to the south and was approached from that side; it did not have a crane, but a weighing machine was provided. Two sidings were present with a loading dock.

By 1954 the loop, footbridge and second platform had been removed, however the goods sidings were still in use.

The site today
The station building survives as do some of the railway associated cottages.

References

Notes

Sources 
 
 
 McLeish, Duncan (2014). Rails to Banff, Macduff and Oldmeldrum. Pub. GNoSRA. .

Disused railway stations in Aberdeenshire
Former Great North of Scotland Railway stations
Railway stations in Great Britain opened in 1860
Railway stations in Great Britain closed in 1951
1861 establishments in Scotland
1951 disestablishments in Scotland